MN may refer to:

Places
 Mongolia (ISO 3166-1 country code)
 Montenegro (former ISO 3166 country code)
 Monaco (FIPS 10-4 country code)
 Minnesota, US (postal abbreviation)
 Manipur, a state in northeast India
 Province of Mantua, or of Mantova, in Italy
 County Monaghan, in Ireland (license plate code)

Language
 Mongolian language (ISO 639-1 code)
 mn (digraph), a combination of letters used in spelling

Science and technology
 Manganese, symbol Mn, a chemical element
 .mn, the Internet country code top-level domain for Mongolia
 Meganewton (MN), a unit of force equal to one million newtons
 millinewton (mN), one-thousandth of a newton
 Membranous nephropathy
 Minimum mode, a hardware mode available to Intel 8086 and 8088 processors
 Number average molecular weight (Mn)

Transport
 Kulula.com (IATA airline designator MN)
 Metro-North Railroad, a commuter railroad in New York City
 Indian Railways station code for Meenambakkam railway station, Chennai, Tamil Nadu, India
 Station code for Madiun railway station, East Java, Indonesia

Other uses
 MN (film), a 1954 Filipino movie
 MN+ an Worldwide Indian Movies Channel 
 Marine Nationale, the French Navy
Merle Norman Cosmetics, an American cosmetic company
 Model number, an identifying number for each particular type of product a manufacturer makes